An electret (formed as a portmanteau of electr- from "electricity" and -et from "magnet") is a dielectric material that has a quasi-permanent electric charge or dipole polarisation. An electret generates internal and external electric fields, and is the electrostatic equivalent of a permanent magnet. Although Oliver Heaviside coined this term in 1885, materials with electret properties were already known to science and had been studied since the early 1700s. One particular example is the electrophorus, a device consisting of a slab with electret properties and a separate metal plate. The electrophorus was originally invented by Johan Carl Wilcke in Sweden and again by Alessandro Volta in Italy.

The name derives from "electron" and "magnet"; drawing analogy to the formation of a magnet by alignment of magnetic domains in a piece of iron. Historically, electrets were made by first melting a suitable dielectric material such as a polymer or wax that contains polar molecules, and then allowing it to re-solidify in a powerful electrostatic field. The polar molecules of the dielectric align themselves to the direction of the electrostatic field, producing a dipole electret with a permanent electrostatic bias. Modern electrets are usually made by embedding excess charges into a highly insulating dielectric, e.g. by means of an electron beam, corona discharge, injection from an electron gun, electric breakdown across a gap, or a dielectric barrier.

Similarity to magnets 
Electrets, like magnets, are dipoles. Another similarity is the radiant fields: they produce an electrostatic field (as opposed to a magnetic field) around their perimeter. When a magnet and an electret are near one another, a rather unusual phenomenon occurs: while stationary, neither has any effect on one another.  However, when an electret is moved with respect to a magnetic pole, a force is felt which acts perpendicular to the magnetic field, pushing the electret along a path 90 degrees to the expected direction of "push" as would be felt with another magnet.

Similarity to capacitors 
There is a similarity between an electret and the dielectric layer used in capacitors; the difference is that dielectrics in capacitors have an induced polarisation that is only transient, dependent on the potential applied on the dielectric, while dielectrics with electret properties exhibit quasi-permanent charge storage or dipole polarisation in addition. Some materials also display ferroelectricity (i.e. they react to the external fields with a hysteresis of the polarisation). Ferroelectrics can retain the polarisation permanently because they are in thermodynamic equilibrium, and thus are used in ferroelectric capacitors. Although electrets are only in a metastable state, those fashioned from very low leakage materials can retain excess charge or polarisation for many years. An electret microphone is a type of condenser microphone that eliminates the need for a polarisation voltage from the power supply by using a permanently charged material.

Electret types 
There are two types of electrets:
 Real-charge electrets which contain excess charge of one or both polarities, either
 on the dielectric's surfaces (a surface charge)
 within the dielectric's volume (a space charge)
 Oriented-dipole electrets contain oriented (aligned) dipoles. Ferroelectric materials are one variant of these.

Cellular space charge electrets with internal bipolar charges at the voids provide a new class of electret materials, that mimic ferroelectrics, hence they are known as ferroelectrets. Ferroelectrets display strong piezoelectricity, comparable to ceramic piezoelectric materials. Some dielectric materials are capable of exhibiting both behaviors.

Materials 
Electret materials are quite common in nature. Quartz and other forms of silicon dioxide, for example, are naturally occurring electrets. Today, most electrets are made from synthetic polymers, e.g. fluoropolymers, polypropylene, polyethyleneterephthalate (PET), etc. Real-charge electrets contain either positive or negative excess charges or both, while oriented-dipole electrets contain oriented dipoles. The quasi-permanent internal or external electric fields created by electrets can be exploited in various applications.

Manufacture
Bulk electrets can be prepared by heating or melting the material, then cooling it in the presence of a strong electric field. The electric field repositions the charge carriers or aligns the dipoles within the material. When the material cools, solidification "freezes" the dipoles in position. Materials used for electrets are usually waxes, polymers or resins. One of the earliest recipes consists of 45% carnauba wax, 45% white rosin, and 10% white beeswax, melted, mixed together, and left to cool in a static electric field of several kilovolts/cm. The thermo-dielectric effect, related to this process, was first described by Brazilian researcher Joaquim Costa Ribeiro.

Electrets can also be manufactured by embedding excess negative charge within a dielectric using a particle accelerator, or by stranding charges on, or near, the surface using high voltage corona discharges, a process called corona charging. Excess charge within an electret decays exponentially. The decay constant is a function of the material's relative dielectric constant and its bulk resistivity. Materials with extremely high resistivity, such as PTFE, may retain excess charge for many hundreds of years. Most commercially produced electrets are based on fluoropolymers (e.g. amorphous Teflon) machined to thin films.

See also

 Oliver Heaviside
 Corona wire
 Telephone
 Electret microphone
 Electromotive force
 Tip ring sleeve
 Ferroelectricity

References

Patents
 Nowlin, Thomas E., and Curt R. Raschke, "A process for making polymer electrets"

Further reading

 
 

A discussion on polarization, thermoelectrets, photoelectrets and applications

Condensed matter physics
Electrical phenomena
Dielectrics
Electrostatics